MacNutt is a village in the Canadian province of Saskatchewan within the Rural Municipality of Churchbridge No. 211 and Census Division No. 5. The former District of Landestreu was renamed in 1909 to honour Thomas MacNutt, the area Member of the Legislative Assembly at the time. The village was settled between the late 1880s and the 1910s by immigrants of predominantly German origin.

History 
MacNutt incorporated as a village on February 22, 1913.

Demographics 

Notable people
 Duane Rupp, hockey player with the Toronto Maple Leafs, Minnesota North Stars, and Pittsburgh Penguins from 1963 to 1973.

See also 

 List of communities in Saskatchewan
 Villages of Saskatchewan

References

Villages in Saskatchewan
Churchbridge No. 211, Saskatchewan
Division No. 5, Saskatchewan
Populated places established in 1880
1880 establishments in the Northwest Territories